The 9th Armoured Division was an armoured division of the British Army, raised during the Second World War. It never saw active service during the war as a complete division.

History
The 9th Armoured was created on 1 December 1940 and dispersed and disbanded on 31 July 1944. It never saw active service during the war as a complete division, although its 27th armoured brigade fought in the Normandy campaign and NW Europe in 1944.

General Officer Commanding
The 9th Armoured Division had three men who held the position of General Officer Commanding during the Second World War.

Component Units
Component units included:

27th Armoured Brigade (transferred from division on 10 August 1942)
 4th/7th Royal Dragoon Guards
 13th/18th Royal Hussars (Queen Mary's Own)
 1st East Riding Yeomanry
 1st Battalion, Queen Victoria's Rifles - renamed 7th Battalion, King's Royal Rifle Corps on 22 March 1941

28th Armoured Brigade
 5th Royal Inniskilling Dragoon Guards
 15th/19th The King's Royal Hussars
 1st Fife and Forfar Yeomanry
 2nd Battalion, Queen Victoria's Rifles - renamed 8th Battalion, King's Royal Rifle Corps on 22 March 1941

9th Support Group (disbanded 12 June 1942)
 11th Battalion, Worcestershire Regiment
 6th Regiment, Royal Horse Artillery
 74th Anti-Tank Regiment, Royal Artillery
 54th (Argyll and Sutherland Highlanders) Light Anti-Aircraft Regiment, Royal Artillery

7th Infantry Brigade (transferred to division on 5 June 1942)
 2nd Battalion, South Wales Borderers
 6th Battalion, Royal Sussex Regiment
 2/6th Battalion, East Surrey Regiment

Divisional Troops
 1st Royal Gloucestershire Hussars - (16 January 1943 - 10 July 1943)  
 6th Regiment, Royal Horse Artillery - (12 June 1942 - 10 July 1944)
 141st (Queen's Own Dorset Yeomanry) Field Regiment, Royal Artillery - (12 June 1942 - 10 July 1944)
 74th Anti-Tank Regiment, Royal Artillery - (12 June 1942 - 6 November 1943)
 92nd (Gordon Highlanders) Anti-Tank Regiment, Royal Artillery - (12 November 1943 - 10 July 1944)
 54th (Argyll and Sutherland Highlanders) Light Anti-Aircraft Regiment, Royal Artillery - (12 June 1942 - 2 March 1944)
 150th (Loyals) Light Anti-Aircraft Regiment, Royal Artillery - (2 March 1944 - 10 July 1944)

See also

 List of British divisions in World War II
 British Armoured formations of World War II

Notes
 Footnotes

 Citations

References

Cole H (1973) Formation Badges of World War 2. Britain, Commonwealth and Empire Arms and Armour Press SBN 85368 078 7

External links
 

Armoured divisions of the British Army in World War II
Military units and formations established in 1940
Military units and formations disestablished in 1944
Military units and formations of the British Empire in World War II